Teignmouth Association Football Club is a football club based in Teignmouth, England. They are currently members of the South West Peninsula League Premier Division East and play at Coombe Valley, Teignmouth.

History
Teignmouth were formed in 1946. In 1982, the club joined the South Western League, leaving six years later. In 1992, Teignmouth became founder members of the Devon County League, before being relegated into the South Devon League in 1999. In 2004, Teignmouth rejoined the Devon County League, winning the league in their first season back. In 2007, Teignmouth became founder members of the South West Peninsula League, being placed in the Division One East. In 2019, Teignmouth became founder members of the Devon League, winning the South West Division three years later. 

In 2022, the club was admitted into the  South West Peninsula League Premier Division East.

Ground
The club currently play at Coombe Valley, Teignmouth.

References

Teignmouth
Association football clubs established in 1946
1946 establishments in England
Football clubs in England
Football clubs in Devon
South Western Football League
Devon County League
South Devon Football League
South West Peninsula League
Devon Football League